John Halford was a cricketer.

John Halford may also refer to:

Johnny Halford, NASCAR driver
Sir John Halford, 4th Baronet, of the Halford baronets
Jack Halford, John "Jack" Halford, fictional character in New Tricks